Type 3c diabetes (also known as pancreatogenic diabetes) is diabetes that comes secondary to pancreatic diseases, involving the exocrine and digestive functions of the pancreas.

Around 5–10% of cases of diabetes in the Western world are related to pancreatic diseases. Chronic pancreatitis is most often the cause.

Presentation
The same complications that occur for other types of diabetics (type 1 and type 2) may occur for type 3c diabetics. These include retinopathy, nephropathy, neuropathy, and cardiovascular disease. Patients with this condition are advised to follow the same risk-reduction guidelines as the other diabetics do and keep blood sugars as normal as possible to minimize any complications.

Cause 
There are multiple causes. Some of which identified are:
 Pancreatic disease
 Pancreatic resection
 Chronic pancreatitis (caused by exocrine insufficiency, maldigestion, and malnutrition).
 Lacking genes in the E2F group.
 In 2021, Venturi reported that pancreas is able to absorb in great quantity radioactive cesium (Cs-134 and Cs-137) causing a severe and permanent pancreatitis with damage of pancreatic islands, and causing (type 3c) diabetes (pancreatogenic). In fact, type 3c diabetes mellitus increased in contaminated population, particularly children and adolescents, after Fukushima and Chernobyl nuclear incidents. At the same time, worldwide pancreatic diseases, diabetes and environmental radiocesium are increasing.

Diagnosis

Management 
The condition can be managed by many factors.

Lifestyle Modifications 
Avoiding toxins to the body such as alcohol and smoking reduce pancreatic inflammation. Also, eating a diet rich in fiber and consuming normal amounts of fat may help. Oral pancreatic enzymes may be given. Maintaining sufficient levels of vitamin D can also reduce symptoms and help manage the disease better.

Medications
Medications such as insulin may be given in order to lower blood sugars. For not so high blood sugars, oral treatments in the form of a pill or capsule may be given.

Usually, insulin requirements are lower than in type 1 diabetes (SAID). However, therapeutic challenges may arise from the fact that hypoglycaemia is a common complication, owing to the lack of alpha cells.

See also 
 Diabetes mellitus
 Pancreatitis
 Exocrine pancreatic insufficiency
 Cystic fibrosis–related diabetes

References 

Diabetes
Pancreas disorders
Inflammations
Exocrine system